Alain Chedanne (1942–2010) was a French writer and professional squatter. He is known for two books, Shit, Man! (1971) and Un Freak (1974), both published by Gallimard. Shit, Man! is regarded as a French 'Beat' novel, and won the Prix des Deux Magots in 1972. Chedanne emerged as a writer in the aftermath of the May 1968 protests in France.

See also
Vagabond

References

External links 
 Alain Chedanne, deux livres dans l’oubli

People from Angers
1942 births
Prix des Deux Magots winners
2010 deaths
20th-century French non-fiction writers
20th-century French male writers